The 1923 Klass I season was the first season of the Klass I, the top level ice hockey league in Sweden. IK Göta won the league championship, as they finished first in the league table.

Final standings

External links

1922-23 season

1
Swedish
Klass I seasons